"Woman Trouble" is a song by Artful Dodger and Robbie Craig featuring British singer Craig David. It reached number six on the UK Singles Chart and peaked within the top 50 in Iceland, Ireland, and New Zealand. In 2015, it earned a silver certification for selling over 200,000 copies in the UK. Capital Xtra included the song in their list of "The Best Old-School Garage Anthems of All Time".

Track listings

UK CD1
 "Woman Trouble" (radio edit) – 3:58
 "Woman Trouble" (Wideboys Pickapocket or Two radio edit) – 3:55
 "Woman Trouble" (original version CD edit) – 5:27
 "Woman Trouble" (Sunkids Latin Thumper edit) – 6:13

UK CD2
 "Woman Trouble" (original version radio edit) – 3:58
 "Woman Trouble" (radio edit) – 3:58
 "Woman Trouble" (Sunship Bombastic radio edit) – 5:42
 "Woman Trouble" (Sunkids Future Discotech edit) – 6:07
 "Woman Trouble" (video track)

UK cassette single
 "Woman Trouble" (radio edit) – 3:58
 "Woman Trouble" (original version radio edit) – 3:58

European CD single
 "Woman Trouble" (radio edit) – 3:58
 "Woman Trouble" (Sunkids Future Discotech edit) – 6:07

Australian CD single
 "Woman Trouble" (radio edit) – 3:58
 "Please Don't Turn Me On"
 "Woman Trouble" (original version radio edit) – 3:58
 "Woman Trouble" (Sunkids Future Discotech edit) – 6:07
 "Woman Trouble" (Wideboy's Pickapocket or Two radio edit) – 3:55
 "Woman Trouble" (video track) – 4:10

Charts

Weekly charts

Year-end charts

Certifications

References

2000 songs
2000 singles
Artful Dodger (duo) songs
Craig David songs
FFRR Records singles
Songs written by Craig David
Songs written by Mark Hill (musician)